The 48° Targa Florio took place on 26 April 1964, on the Circuito Piccolo delle Madonie, Sicily (Italy). Porsche took the overall victory.

Race
The event was marked by the absence of Scuderia Ferrari: FIA refused to homologate the brand new 250 LM as a GT-class racer, and Ferrari boycotted the race in protest. The Ferraris that took part in the race were all driven by privateers.
The prototype-class Porsche 718 RS Spyder driven by Jo Bonnier and Graham Hill took the lead, but had to retire during the second lap. Then the leading Porsche 904/8 of Edgar Barth and Umberto Maglioli suffered some time-wasting issue and was overtaken by the Ferrari 250 GTO '64 of Carlo Facetti and Jean Guichet, which had to retire during lap 6 for gearbox issues. The Shelby Cobra's debut at the Targa Florio was disappointing as they soon proved too heavy and unwieldy for the narrow and twisty track. In the end, the podium went to 3 GT-class, with Porsche scoring a double victory with the 904 GTS of Antonio Pucci/Colin Davis and Gianni Balzarini/Herbert Linge, respectively.

Official results

References

Targa Florio
Targa Florio